Edward "Teddy" Bury Dewhurst (7 April 1870 – 25 February 1941) was an Australian male tennis player. He became a U.S. citizen after retirement.

Biography
Edward Bury Dewhurst was born in Sydney, Australia in 1870, the son of Arthur Dewhurst and Emma Owen. At age 33, in 1903, he left Australia to study dentistry at the University of Pennsylvania in the United States.

Dewhurst became the singles Intercollegiate Champion for the University of Pennsylvania in 1903 and 1905 as well as doubles champion in 1905. In 1904 he was runner up in the singles. In 1904 he won the men's doubles at the Niagara International Tennis Tournament together with H.J. Holt when their opponents defaulted the match at two sets all due to darkness.

He won the singles title at the 1905 U.S. National Indoor Tennis Championships where he defeated the reigning champion of the previous two years, Wylie Grant in three straight sets 6–3, 8–6, 6–4. The tournament was played on board courts at the Seventh Regiment Armory in New York.

In 1906, Dewhurst won the mixed doubles title at the U.S. National Championships together with Sarah Coffin. The previous year, 1905, he had reached the finals of this event, played at the Philadelphia Cricket Club, with Elisabeth Moore but lost to Augusta Schultz and Clarence Hobart in straight sets. 	

Dewhurst retired from tennis in 1909 due to blood poisoning.

Dewhurst published a book titled The Science of Lawn Tennis in 1910.

In 1911, he married Ethel Voorhies (née Grannan). He became a U.S. citizen in 1924.

He died in Philadelphia of heart disease in 1941, age 70.

Grand Slam finals

Mixed doubles (1 title, 1 runner-up)

References

External links
 HathiTrust Digital Library – The Science of Lawn Tennis (1910), by Edward B. Dewhurst

1870 births
1941 deaths
Tennis players from Sydney
Australian male tennis players
United States National champions (tennis)
Grand Slam (tennis) champions in mixed doubles
Australian emigrants to the United States
People from Philadelphia
American dentists
Australian dentists
University of Pennsylvania School of Dental Medicine alumni
Penn Quakers men's tennis players